The Department of Primary Industries and Energy was an Australian government department that existed between July 1987 and October 1998.

Scope
Information about the department's functions and/or government funding allocation could be found in the Administrative Arrangements Orders, the annual Portfolio Budget Statements and in the Department's annual reports.

At its creation, the Department was responsible for:
Agricultural, pastoral, fishing, forest, mineral and energy industries, and electricity
Water and other natural resources
Primary industries inspection and quarantine
Primary industries and energy science and research, including geoscience
Commodity marketing, including export promotion
Commodity-specific international organisations and activities  
Administration of international commodity agreements
Administration of export controls on primary industries and energy products
Radioactive waste management.

Structure
The Department was an Australian Public Service department, staffed by officials who were responsible to the Minister for Primary Industries and Energy.

References

Ministries established in 1987
Primary Industries and Energy
Australia